The Dodge Cherokee is a racing car manufactured and developed in Argentina for its participation in the Turismo Carretera. It is a sports development carried out under the regulations of the Asociación Corredores de Turismo Carretera, using the Dodge GTX production model, manufactured in Argentina in the 1970s, as its basis.

This prototype was developed and presented in the mid-1990s under production standards imposed by ACTC, in order to provide Dodge brand users in the category with a new tool to compete on equal terms, taking into account the sporting situation that they lived after having exercised an important dominance with the obtaining of almost all the championships of the eighties and having produced after that, a polarization on the part of the Ford and Chevrolet brands.

The development of this car consisted of the replacement of the original powertrain, the famous Slant Six engine of origin in the 1960s and that would equip from the Valiant V200 to the 6-cylinder GTX Coupés and the RT coupes; being implemented instead an engine developed by AMC and produced by Chrysler to equip its Jeep Cherokee product (this is where the name is borrowed to baptize the prototype), which in turn receives a modification in its nominal measurements to fill in the regulatory nominal cylinder capacity imposed by the ACTC. To all this, continuous aerodynamic reforms developed by ACTC were added, according to the technical regulations presented in the different seasons. Thanks to this driver, the prototype not only managed to return the Dodge brand to the forefront of Turismo Carretera, obtaining the 2003 and 2007 championships, but it also obtained approval from ACTC for its participation in its lower divisions, where it also reaped great results exhibiting great performance.

On the other hand, the presentation of this car took place as a result of the appearance in 1995 of the Torino Cherokee prototype and the corresponding homologation received for its AMC XJ engine, therefore both the Dodge model and the one based on the IKA Torino, share many of its mechanical and tuning solutions.

History

Despite having started its participation almost from the dawn of the category, in the thirties, the presence of the Dodge brand within the Turismo Carretera only acquired notoriety during much of the eighties, where by the hand of pilots such as Roberto Mouras, Oscar Castellano and Oscar Angeletti won almost all of the titles of the period, having as its main tool the new Dodge GTX, a large-sized passenger car with an aerodynamic design, which was nothing more than the coupe variant of the Dodge Polara model.

Because the 318-cubic-inch V8 engine clearly exceeded the statutory nominal minimum for the category (3000 cm³), not that engine was used but the Slant-Six 6-cylinder in-line whose original displacement of 225 cubic inches (3688 cm³) it was reduced to comply with such regulations. At the same time, the fact that all brands had a compression ratio of 8: 1 greatly favored the Dodge model that featured a highly aerodynamic design.

The appearance of the GTX was a lethal bet on the part of Dodge, since thanks to its aerodynamic design it soon placed itself at the forefront of the actions initiating an important escalation on the part of its users, who in the term of 10 years took 8 of the 10 titles at stake (Antonio Aventín in 1980-81, Mouras in 1982, 1983, 1984 and 1985, Angeletti in 1986 and Castellano in 1987 and 1988). Faced with so much supremacy exposed by the Dodge, for the year 1989 ACTC implemented a technical reform to the general regulations of the category, granting one more point of compression at the end of 1988 for the Ford and Chevrolet brands, going from 8: 1 to 9: 1 . These measures were ratified for the 1989 championship, which caused Dodge's main references to choose to compete with other brands, leaving the brand with few references on the track. To this situation, high maintenance costs were added. that began to manifest themselves, after the production of the Dodge brand was concluded in 1982. Even so, after this decision that clearly caused Dodge's relegation in the TC, its users managed to obtain acceptable results, reaching the runner-up in 1992 by the hand of Juan Manuel Landa.

Regulatory Revolution

After Landa obtained runner-up in 1992, little by little the effects of the regulatory restriction imposed by ACTC on Dodge users began to become apparent. After that championship in which 3 victories left Landa at the gates of the title, the Dodge began to be increasingly relegated not only in the consideration of the drivers, but also in the development of their units, compared to the models of Ford and Chevrolet. The maintenance costs of this unit also made a dent in terms of the preparation and putting on the track of this model, which caused it to gradually go down the path of oblivion.

The panorama of the brand did not improve until the year 1997, when, at the command of an experimental model, ex-Formula One driver and TC 2000 champion Miguel Ángel Guerra made his debut as a titular driver, who put on track a Dodge GTX unit equipped with a 4.0-liter AMC XJ engine, manufactured by Chrysler to equip its Jeep Cherokee product, a model that since 1997 had part of its world production located in Argentina. The appearance of this new unit, caused great surprise in the atmosphere of the category, since in its presentation career it was placed on a par with the Ford Falcon and Chevrolet Chevy Malibu, generating surprise among fans and controversy among users of the others. marks because the new engine widely exceeded the maximum statutory displacement stipulated by ACTC. The issue ended up being resolved with the requirement by the supervisory body to adapt the cylinder capacity to the stipulated limit, to finally be able to receive its corresponding homologation.

Engine development
  
To develop the new power plant that equipped the Dodge GTX from the year 1997, its preparers had to take into account various aspects in terms of the benefits that the new prototype could offer. One of the aspects that were taken into account the most was the aesthetic configuration of the model, since its highly aerodynamic design offered many advantages in a comparison with other models with engines in equal conditions (same displacement, same compression ratio, same number of revolutions, etc.) To all this, the fact that the AMC XJ was an engine designed 15 years after the launch of its rival engines and that its power was provided through an injection pump, caused that it had to be modified its power source by replacing said pump with a carburetor, for which it had to resort to an intake manifold similar to that used by the Ford Falcons. In an analysis column, carried out by the renowned professor Alberto Juárez for the Campeones magazine, the development carried out was detailed verbatim as follows:

Development and first results 

After the technical adaptation made to the new engine, ACTC ended up approving it as a new optional engine for users of the Dodge and Torino brands. Soon, the results began to be seen, with the arrival of the first triumphs of the hand of Ernesto Bessone II in 1998 and Edgardo Lavari in 1999. The evolution of the model began to be such that it quickly settled in the fight for the title in 2000, when Bessone finished the tournament in third place, highlighting the evolution of the model that was gradually beginning to take hold in the category.

On the other hand, the implementation of the "Dodge Cherokee" was also approved in the lower divisions of ACTC, being first released by the TC Pista division and in subsequent years by the TC Mouras and TC Pista Mouras divisions.

The first titles
After having reaped its first successes within the TC, the question remained to what extent the development of the new drivers of the Dodge brand would go. Such a mystery would begin to reveal itself in the following years, with 2003 being the season that would mark the peak in terms of the development and evolution of the Dodge Cherokee, since in that season and after 13 years of drought, the brand would once again conquer the crown of Turismo Carretera led by Bessone, who would prevail with his unit over the representatives of the Chevrolet and Ford brands, who had polarized the actions of the category during those 13 years. The harvest of titles would continue in 2006 with the coronation of Norberto Fontana, who would prevail after a controversial definition that included the declassification of his opponent on duty, Diego Aventín.

After these great results, finally the new prototype would be consolidated within the ACTC major division, also having similar successes in the lower divisions, since in TC Pista, the drivers Jonatan Castellano (2005) 10 and Nicolás Pezzucchi (2013) would be crowned champions with this model, while in TC Pista Mouras, Pezzucchi himself (2011) and Claudio Di Noto Rama (2014) would have this privilege. Currently, the development of the model is such that its level of evolution is equates with the other participating models in the category.

References 

Cherokee
Turismo Carretera